Andrea Gaudenzi (born 30 July 1973) is an Italian former tennis player and the current chairman of the Association of Tennis Professionals (ATP) since January 2020.

Gaudenzi was born in Faenza, Italy, in the province of Ravenna, and turned professional in 1990 after becoming Junior World Champion by winning both the French Open and US Open junior titles. He reached a career high ATP singles ranking of world No. 18 in 1995.He has victories over Roger Federer in 2002 Rome, Pete Sampras in the 2002 French Open, Jim Courier in the 1994 US Open as well as Goran Ivanisevic, Thomas Muster, Michael Stich and  Yevgeny Kafelnikov. He represented Italy at the 1996 Summer Olympics in Atlanta, where he was defeated in the third round by the eventual champion Andre Agassi, and reached the Davis Cup Final in 1998, semifinals in 1995 and 1996, playing both singles and doubles. He won three ATP Tour titles and six finals, and he reached the semifinals in the Monte Carlo Master Series in 1995, losing to Thomas Muster.Gaudenzi graduated in law from University of Bologna and obtained an MBA with Honors at IUM.He currently serves as Executive Chairman of the ATP Tour, the governing body of the men's professional tennis circuits - the ATP Tour, the ATP Challenger Tour and the ATP Champions Tour, and is a board member of ATP Media.Previously, he was a partner and Chief Revenue Officer at Musixmatch, a music data company, and also co-founded and was CMO at Soldo (company), a financial services company.

Junior Grand Slam finals

Singles: 2 (2 titles)

ATP career finals

Singles: 9 (3 titles, 6 runner-ups)

Doubles: 6 (2 titles, 4 runner-ups)

ATP Challenger and ITF Futures finals

Singles: 12 (9–3)

Doubles: 5 (1–4)

Performance timelines

Singles

Doubles

References

External links
 
 
 
 
 

1973 births
Living people
Italian male tennis players
Olympic tennis players of Italy
People from Faenza
Tennis players at the 1996 Summer Olympics
US Open (tennis) junior champions
Italian expatriates in Monaco
French Open junior champions
Grand Slam (tennis) champions in boys' singles
Sportspeople from the Province of Ravenna